Rohrach may refer to:

 Rohrach (Eyb), a river of Baden-Württemberg, Germany, tributary of the Eyb
 Rohrach (Iller), a river of Bavaria, Germany, tributary of the Iller
 Rohrach (Wörnitz), a river of Bavaria, Germany, tributary of the Wörnitz